"Praise of the Two Lands", appearing in an inscription (c. 2613 BCE) of boat building projects of Egyptian pharaoh Sneferu, is the first reference to a ship bearing a name.

Description 

The large Egyptian vessel, built by the pharaoh Sneferu, was about 100 cubits (just over 50 m) long and made of cedar wood. Ancient Egypt was treeless, generally speaking, and domestic wood was very rare. The earliest boats on the Nile were assembled of bundled reeds lashed together, the two sḥn ("armloads") of the Pyramid Texts. The earliest written record of international trade of timber is from the Palermo Stone where Sneferu imports cedar from Phoenicia (now Lebanon), Bringing forty ships filled [with] cedar logs. Shipbuilding [of] cedar wood, one ship, 100 cubits [long]...

During ancient times, "name devices" for ships typically were of gods/goddesses of the city in which it came from or the name of the guardian deity. Typically called a parasemon or episemon, it was the ship's name and often indicated the hope for good luck at sea. 

Many times an ancient Egyptian ship was named after the pharaoh and one of his virtues. For example, the ship of Amenhotep II, who reigned 1427 BCE to 1400 BCE, was called, Amenhotep II who made strong the Two Lands.  This ship was built some 1200 years after Sneferu's, Praise of the Two Lands, which is the earliest known ship name. The "Two Lands" referred to here are Upper Egypt upriver and Lower Egypt at the delta. The name of Sneferu's ship Praise of the Two Lands had political implications as the name is believed to have signified the unity between the lands of Upper and Lower Egypt.

It is not known if the name of the ship (i.e. Praise of the Two Lands) was put on its side as is done today so others could see the letters. It is likely that a bold mark was used instead since there were no telescopes that could be used from shore or another ship. The special mark would be the means of identification.

Footnotes

Sources 

 Anzovin, Steven et al., Famous First Facts (International Edition), H. W. Wilson Company, 2000, 
 Casson, Lionel, Ships and seamanship in the ancient world,  JHU Press, 1995, 
 Kennedy, Don H. et al., Ship names: origins and usages during 45 centuries, published for Mariners Museum by University Press of Virginia, Charlottesville, 1974, 
 Meyers, Eric M., Wood, The Oxford Encyclopedia of Archaeology in the Near East, New York, Oxford University Press, 1997, 
 Spectre, Peter H., A Mariner's Miscellany, Sheridan House, Inc., 2005,  
 Sperber, Daniel, Nautica Talmudica, Brill Archive, 1986, 
 Williams, Robert H., Joyful Trek, Texas Tech University Press, 1996,

Further reading 

 Clary, James, Superstitions of the Sea: A Digest of Beliefs, Custom and Mystery, Maritime History in Art, 1994, 

Ancient Egyptian ships
Ancient Egyptian society
Fourth Dynasty of Egypt
Sneferu
Ancient Egyptian technology
Egyptian inventions